Thaddeus Cho Hwan-kil (born 7 November 1954) is a Korean prelate of the Catholic Church. He is the tenth and current Archbishop of Daegu, having been appointed by Pope Benedict XVI in 2010.

Early life
The fourth of eight children, Cho was born in Dalseong County, Daegu, to Raymund Cho Sun-jo (조순조 라이문도, d. 2000) and Nympha Na Il-nam(나일남 님파).

Priesthood and Auxiliary Bishop of Daegu
After being ordained to the Priesthood in 1981, Cho served as the Pastor of Deoksoo Parish and Hyeonggok Parish of Daegu, Director of Gwandeokjeong Martyrs' Memorial in Daegu, President of Maeil Newspaper of Daegu, and was appointed as an Auxiliary Bishop of Daegu and Titular Bishop of Abbir Maius on March 23, 2007. He received his episcopal consecration on the following April 3 from Archbishop John Choi Young-su, with Bishop John Chrisostom Kwon Hyok-ju, Bishop of Andong and Bishop Augustine Cheong Myong-jo, Bishop of Busan serving as co-consecrators. He chose as his episcopal motto: Sicut erat in principio, et nunc, et semper, et in saecula saeculorum, meaning "Both now and always, and unto the ages of ages" (처음과 같이 이제와 항상 영원히).

With Archbishop John Choi Young-su's resignation in 2009, Cho had been acting as the Vicar General of the Daegu until 2010.

Archbishop of Daegu
On June 25, 2002, Cho was appointed the tenth Archbishop of Daegu by Pope Benedict XVI. He was formally installed at the Gyesan-dong Cathedral of Our Lady of Lourdes on December 20, 2010. He received the pallium, a vestment worn by metropolitan bishops, from Pope Benedict XVI on June 29, 2011, in a ceremony at St. Peter's Basilica.

References

External links
Profile from the Catholic Bishops' Conference of Korea
Profile from Catholic Hierarchy

21st-century Roman Catholic archbishops in South Korea
Living people
1954 births
People from Daegu
South Korean Roman Catholic archbishops
Roman Catholic archbishops of Daegu